Sean Osborn (born 1966) is a former clarinetist of the Metropolitan Opera Orchestra and a regular substitute in the clarinet section of the Seattle Symphony Orchestra. He has been a student of Stanley Hasty, Frank Kowalsky, and Eric Mandat.

Clarinetist
Winner of The American Prize in instrumental performance for 2017-18, Sean Osborn has traveled the world as soloist and chamber musician, and during his 11 years with the Metropolitan Opera. He has also performed as guest principal clarinet with the New York Philharmonic, Pittsburgh Symphony, Seattle Symphony, and the American Symphony Orchestra.  He has over 40 concertos in his repertoire, and extensive chamber music experience.  A new music specialist, he has premiered over 100 works, including those of Philip Glass, John Corigliano, Chen Yi, Chinary Ung, Eric Mandat, and others. He appears on over 50 CDs with the Metropolitan Opera, New York Philharmonic, Seattle Symphony, and several chamber music groups.  He has multiple solo CD releases on Albany Records, including Cyrille Rose 32 Etudes, Sean Osborn plays Mozart, Bits and Pieces and American Spirit. He has also appeared on nearly 100 Film and Video game soundtrack recordings, including About Schmidt, Wedding Crashers, Animatrix, Call of Duty 3, and Windows XP.

Composer
Osborn is a composer, whose works have been performed around the world by groups such as the London Philharmonic Orchestra, the Toledo Clarinets, and members of the orchestras of Los Angeles, Detroit, Boston, New York, and others.  Many of his compositions are available on his website for free download.

Selected Compositions
 Symphony No. 1 "September 11th"
 Symphony No. 2 (for Band)
 Concerto for Chamber Orchestra
 Trumpet Concerto
 Trombone Concerto
 Oboe Concerto
 Serenade for Woodwinds (an updated companion to Mozart's Gran Partita)
 Violin Sonata
 Quintet for Clarinet and Strings, "The Beatles"
 Quintet No. 1 for Clarinet and Strings
 Lyric Pieces for Violin, Clarinet, 'Cello, and Piano
 Two Reed Trios
 Sonata for E-flat Clarinet and Piano
 The Machine, for Wind Quintet
 Bulldog March (for Band) 
 Fantasy on "Lo, How a Rose e'er Blooming" (for Band)
 Several pieces for clarinet solo, duo, trio, and quartet
 Several pieces for various combinations of woodwinds
 Several small pieces for piano solo

Orchestrations/Arrangements
 Preludes, Book 1. by Claude Debussy for Orchestra
 Suite of Music by William Byrd, for clarinet quartet
 smaller pieces and Christmas songs for clarinet quartet or Wind Quintet
 pieces by Grieg, Bach, Faure and others for Wind Quintet

Educator
From 2006-2009 Osborn was on the faculty of the University of Washington, where he taught clarinet lessons, reedmaking, and clarinet techniques.  He was also on the faculty of the Cornish College of the Arts. He has presented scores of master classes throughout North America at the Eastman School of Music, Northwestern University, Rice University, Manhattan School of Music, and many other schools, as well as in Japan and Slovenia. During the summer, he coaches chamber groups at the Vivace! chamber music camp at Seattle Pacific University.  He is also the founder and director of the free, educationally-based Clarinettissimo clarinet festival, held every October.

His extensive website has much educational content, including a large series of videos and essays on playing orchestral excerpts, and other essays, including those published in The Clarinet.  Additional videos on his YouTube page cover extended techniques and how to teach the clarinet.

Namesakes
Clarinetist Sean Osborn shouldn't be confused with Irish rower Seán Osborne.

References

Biography at Seattle Chamber Music Society's website
Biography at Albany Record's website
 Seattle Post-Intelligencer article

External links
Official website
Clarinettissimo festival page

Living people
American clarinetists
Curtis Institute of Music alumni
1966 births
Musicians from Tacoma, Washington
21st-century clarinetists